The Big Smoke (TBS) is an opinion site published by the Tselios Media Group which also runs The Big Smoke Plus, a digital agency.  It features both established and emerging writers. It publishes original opinion articles on news, politics, the arts, lifestyle, law, social issues, satire and business. It was founded in 2013 in Australia, with a United States version launched in 2015. Its founder and CEO is entrepreneur, social commentator and business columnist Alexandra Tselios.

Notable contributors 
TBS features both established and emerging writers.
 Anthony Albanese, Australian politician
 Franca Arena, Australian politician and activist
 Maggie Beer, Australian cook
 Bob Brown, former politician and environmental activist
 Julian Burnside, barrister and activist
 Paul Capsis, actor and musician
 Jane Caro, social commentator, writer and lecturer
 Nicholas Cowdery, barrister
 Alex Greenwich, Australian politician and LGBT activist
 Derryn Hinch, media personality
 Gretel Killeen, comedian and television personality
 John Mangos, news presenter
 Clover Moore, Lord Mayor of the City of Sydney
 Lee Rhiannon, Australian politician
 Henry Rollins, American musician

References

Australian news websites
Internet properties established in 2013